Natalie Horrocks (also Brownlow and Barnes) is a fictional character from the British ITV soap opera Coronation Street, played by Denise Welch. She made her first appearance during the episode broadcast on 26 February 1997. She departed the series on 31 December 2000.

Storylines
Natalie first appears in Weatherfield in February 1997 after her son Tony Horrocks (Lee Warburton), co-owner of MVB Motors, suffers a breakdown after running over and killing Joyce Smedley (Anita Carey) in his car. She takes over the running of the garage, implementing a new billing system computer program and acting as part owner and manager in her son's absence. There she begins a relationship with Tony's business partner Kevin Webster (Michael Le Vell), despite the fact he is married and a lot younger than her. She seduces him and convinces him that she only wants an affair with no strings attached. Kevin, who is lonely as his wife Sally (Sally Dynevor) is in Scarborough, decides to take a chance and he and Natalie embark on an affair.

After a period of time, Natalie decides that she wants Kevin full-time as she has fallen in love with him. She convinces him to leave Sally and move in with her, which he does. As a result of this, Natalie becomes the most hated woman on the street and Sally slaps her. Sally demands money for their daughters' upbringing, putting a strain on Natalie and Kevin's relationship. By Christmas 1997, Kevin begins to miss his family. He leaves Natalie and returns to Sally and his children. Natalie is devastated at her loss. After finding herself unwanted at the garage, and feeling that it does not warrant her time, Natalie gets a job as The Rovers' new barmaid. The regulars are dismayed by this and some refuse to drink there. With time, the regulars soften and Natalie becomes less offensive and people start to like her off-the-cuff manner.

Natalie becomes friendly with Des Barnes (Philip Middlemiss) while he is dating her colleague, fellow barmaid Samantha Failsworth (Tina Hobley). When their relationship ends, Natalie is there as a friend for Des. Samantha begins stalking Natalie and is jealous of her friendship with Des. When Samantha kidnaps Natalie's cat, the relationship between Des and Natalie grows. She struggles for months to fight her attraction to him but in the end, they find themselves together. This is the relationship they had both longed for and they consider each other a perfect match.

Tony's return to Weatherfield in the autumn of 1998 triggers events that leave Natalie devastated. In early October, Des proposes to her and she accepts. Their wedding is the event of the Street and all the residents attend. The marquee is decorated by Hayley Patterson (Julie Hesmondhalgh), the best man is Les Battersby (Bruce Jones) and the champagne flows. It is a union toasted by everybody, except the Websters.

Unknown to all except Des, Tony has arrived on the Street with serious problems. He is now a drug dealer and in big financial trouble. He needs money and Natalie is quick to give him what he needs, although she never knows what it is for; it is not enough. While at home one night, Tony is accosted by three drug dealers, looking for the money that he owes them. Des happens to be there as they attack Tony and while trying to help him, he hits his head, sending him crashing onto the coffee table. Des dies in hospital of a heart attack. Bereft and looking for a new start, Natalie seeks comfort from The Rovers. Finding that it is for sale, Natalie buys the pub from Alec Gilroy (Roy Barraclough) on 30 December 1998. After shifting Jack (Bill Tarmey) and Vera Duckworth (Liz Dawn) from their lodgings upstairs, Natalie moves into the pub and redecorates.

As The Rovers new landlady, Natalie has a brief relationship with Ian Bentley (Jonathan Guy Lewis), aware that he is engaged but unaware that he is engaged to Rita Sullivan's (Barbara Knox) former foster daughter Sharon Gaskell (Tracie Bennett). The Rovers' barmaid Betty Williams (Betty Driver) sees Natalie and Ian together, and tells Rita - who confronts Natalie. Natalie finishes with Ian and Sharon leaves him at the altar; however, after this, Natalie and Sharon begin a feud.

After the break-up of her marriage to Nick Tilsley (Adam Rickett), Leanne Battersby (Jane Danson) moves into The Rovers with Natalie. The Rovers is robbed on New Year's Day 2000 after Leanne falls into debt with drug dealer Jez Quigley (Lee Boardman) over her cocaine addiction. The Rovers robbery leaves Leanne hospitalised, and after she confesses to Natalie, Natalie agrees to support her, and seeks help for her with a drug counsellor.

Natalie is devastated to discover that the body recently found on the new development of Victoria Street is that of her son, Tony. He is found by Natalie's on-off lover, Vinny Sorrell (James Gaddas), after he falls through a hole. Vinny has worked with Natalie as barman in The Rovers but when they decide working together is bad for their relationship, he takes a job as a labourer. Natalie suffers a breakdown, confused over her feelings over Tony's death, as she had blamed him for causing Des's death. Des's brother Colin Barnes (Ian Embleton) makes a scene at Tony's funeral, which leads to the police questioning him. To avoid arrest, he tells the police that he was with Natalie on the night Tony died. Natalie is ashamed, especially as it damages her relationship with Vinny, but is determined to find out who has murdered her son, putting up a £10,000 award for information, regarding Tony's death. Steve McDonald (Simon Gregson) tells Natalie that had threatened him about using the mini-cab firm to supply drugs. When Steve stands up to him, Jez says that he would have to face the fate that had befallen Tony. Natalie goes to the police with this information and Jez is arrested but is found not guilty when Steve's motives as a witness are questioned.

Natalie starts rebuilding her life, and discovers that she is pregnant with Vinny's baby, but faces another blow on discovering that Vinny is dating her sister, Debs Brownlow (Gabrielle Glaister). She had recently moved to Weatherfield after working as a hairdresser on cruise ships. Natalie feels she cannot forgive them for this, and rejects both of them and evicts Debs from No.6. They leave Weatherfield together, going to Southampton, with Vinny hoping to get a job with Debs on a cruise ship, unaware that Natalie is pregnant. Natalie wants to keep the baby but decides that she does not want to bring her child up in a pub and in urban Weatherfield. During Christmas 2000, after inviting Kevin for Christmas dinner, she is accosted by Sally in The Rovers. Sally assumes that she is trying to seduce Kevin again but Natalie retorts by telling her that she has some nerve to accuse her of attempting to seduce Kevin after she slept with Kevin the night before he married Alison Wakefield (Naomi Radcliffe) and Sally leaves the pub, humiliated. Natalie sells The Rovers intending to start a new life in the Cotswolds, but there are protests from the residents when Natalie decides to sell to the Boozy Chain, who intend to call the place The Boozy Newt. After some negotiation, businessmen Duggie Ferguson (John Bowe), Fred Elliott (John Savident) and Mike Baldwin (Johnny Briggs) agree to buy the pub and save it from its fate with the Boozy Chain. Natalie leaves Weatherfield for Consett on New Year's Eve 2000.

Barmaid Geena Gregory (Jennifer James) announces in The Rovers that Natalie has given birth to a baby girl named Laura. It is uncertain if Natalie still has shares in Kevin's garage. Natalie is mentioned again in November 2009 when Kevin starts an affair with Molly Dobbs (Vicky Binns). Molly's husband Tyrone (Alan Halsall) tells Molly about Kevin's past affairs, saying that Natalie was the biggest of them all but he and Sally would always end up back together.

Development

Departure
In 2000, it was reported that Denise Welch would leave the ITV soap at the end of the year as she was expecting a baby in March, but it is believed she had planned to leave the series anyway before learning of her pregnancy.

Welch said: "I am looking forward to being a mum again and spending some time with my baby and am relishing the prospect of new challenges in my career."

A Granada spokeswoman said the company had known of her decision "for some time. This has given us the opportunity to give a dramatic exit for the character of Natalie Horrocks for the end of the year. We wish Denise well both for the birth of her baby and for her future career. Natalie's exit will come in December - the month which sees Coronation Street's 40th birthday. Viewers have seen her steal Kevin Webster, from his wife Sally, and her own husband Des Barnes was murdered a month after they married last year."

References

External links

Coronation Street characters
Television characters introduced in 1997
Fictional bartenders
Female characters in television
Fictional female businesspeople